Carlo Valentini (born 15 March 1982) is a San Marinese footballer who currently plays for S.S. Murata and formerly the San Marino national football team.

References

S.S. Murata players
1982 births
Living people
Sammarinese footballers
San Marino international footballers
S.S. Virtus players
F.C. Domagnano players
Campionato Sammarinese di Calcio players

Association football midfielders